Aveeno is an American brand of skin care and hair care products owned by American consumer goods and pharmaceutical company Johnson & Johnson.

History
Aveeno was founded in 1945 by brothers Albert and Sidney Musher, and its first product was their Soothing Bath Treatment. The active ingredients in all Aveeno products are colloidal oats or oat extracts—avenanthramides, which have been branded as "active naturals".  The brand slogan is "Better Ingredients. Better Skincare: Aveeno." Aveeno offers products to treat skin conditions such as eczema, psoriasis, urushiol-induced contact dermatitis, pruritus ani, chickenpox, hives, and sunburn.

The name Aveeno is derived from the scientific name for the common oat, Avena sativa.

Aveeno was originally made by Rydelle Laboratories, a division of S. C. Johnson & Son, which dropped the Rydelle name in 1989, and was later purchased by Johnson & Johnson in 1999. In 2001, the brand was expanded into the baby care and body wash categories with Aveeno Baby and Aveeno Skin Relief Body Wash. In 2004, the brand was launched into the facial care category with the Positively Radiant line, based on the "Active Soy" ingredient. In 2005, Aveeno Clear Complexion acne care was introduced and in 2006, Aveeno Ultra Calming launched.  In 2007, Aveeno Anti-Aging was introduced to the market.

Spokemodels
In January 2013, Jennifer Aniston was announced as the Aveeno spokesperson.  She replaced Daniella van Graas, who had been Aveeno's spokesmodel and 'face' for many years. Aniston reportedly received "eight figures" for the role.

In July 2021, parent company Johnson & Johnson recalled many Aveeno and Neutrogena aerosol spray sunscreens in the United States, after detecting benzene, a chemical that can cause cancer. The company stated that benzene is not used in the manufacturing process of the sprays and that they have begun an investigation into the source of the contamination.

Environmental pollution
Aveeno has been criticized for selling products that contain microbeads, small plastic balls that are not removed in sewage treatment works, and often end up in the ocean. Johnson & Johnson promised to remove microbeads from their products by 2017.

See also

References

External links

 

Johnson & Johnson brands
Products introduced in 1945